Ekaterina Igorevna Pantyukhina (born 9 April 1993) is a Russian football forward, currently playing for Zenit.

Honours 
Zvezda Perm
Winner
 Russian Women's Football Championship: 2014
 Russian Women's Cup: 2012, 2013

Runners-up

 Russian Women's Football Championship: 2013

International career

External links 
 

1993 births
Living people
Russian women's footballers
Russia women's international footballers
Women's association football defenders
Zvezda 2005 Perm players
Universiade bronze medalists for Russia
Universiade medalists in football
People from Vyatskiye Polyany
Sportspeople from Kirov Oblast
Russian Women's Football Championship players
UEFA Women's Euro 2017 players